Bucculatrix cuneigera is a moth in the family Bucculatricidae. It is found in North America, where it has been recorded from Quebec, Ontario, New Brunswick, Nova Scotia, Maine, Ohio, New York, Massachusetts and North Carolina. It was described by Edward Meyrick in 1919.

The wingspan is 9-10.5 mm. The forewings are dark brown or almost black with white marks. The hindwings are dark brownish or blackish grey. Adults have been recorded on wing from May to July.

The larvae feed on Aster species, including Aster shortii. They mine the leaves of their host plant. The mine has the form of a long contorted and sometimes spiral mine. The species overwinters within the mine in a flat circular yellow cocoon. After hibernation, the larva bores into a growing shoot just below the tip, hollowing out the stem. Full-grown larvae leave the stem and pupate in a white or pale yellowish cocoon. The cocoon is spun on dead stems and twigs near the host plant.

References

Natural History Museum Lepidoptera generic names catalog

Bucculatricidae
Moths described in 1919
Taxa named by Edward Meyrick
Moths of North America